José María Benavides (born 7 January 1945) is a Spanish sailor. He competed at the 1976 Summer Olympics and the 1980 Summer Olympics.

References

External links
 

1945 births
Living people
Spanish male sailors (sport)
Olympic sailors of Spain
Sailors at the 1976 Summer Olympics – Flying Dutchman
Sailors at the 1980 Summer Olympics – Star
Place of birth missing (living people)
Sailors (sport) from the Basque Country (autonomous community)
People from Elgoibar
Sportspeople from Gipuzkoa